Church of Immaculate Conception is a Roman Catholic Church situated in Kanhai, sector 45, Gurgaon, Haryana, India. This is the only Roman Catholic Church in Gurgaon.

The church mission was established by a capuchin friar in 1930 but the church building was constructed in year 2001 by efforts of Fr. Lourdusamy.

The church is under the jurisdiction of the Roman Catholic Archdiocese of Delhi. This is the only Latin Church in Gurgaon.

References 

2001 establishments in Haryana
Roman Catholic churches in Delhi
Roman Catholic churches in India
Roman Catholic churches completed in 2001
21st-century Roman Catholic church buildings in India